Melfa is a town in Accomack County on the Eastern Shore of Virginia in the United States. The population was 408 at the 2010 census.

Geography
Melfa is located at  (37.649836, −75.741523).

According to the United States Census Bureau, the town has a total area of 0.3 square miles (0.7 km), all of it land. It rests at an elevation of 49 feet.

Demographics

At the 2000 census there were 450 people, 183 households, and 131 families living in the town. The population density was 1,654.6 people per square mile (643.5/km). There were 205 housing units at an average density of 753.8 per square mile (293.2/km).  The racial makeup of the town was 82.44% White, 15.78% African American, 0.22% Native American, 1.33% from other races, and 0.22% from two or more races. Hispanic or Latino of any race were 2.22%.

Of the 183 households 32.2% had children under the age of 18 living with them, 60.1% were married couples living together, 10.4% had a female householder with no husband present, and 28.4% were non-families. 22.4% of households were one person and 10.4% were one person aged 65 or older. The average household size was 2.46 and the average family size was 2.93.

The age distribution was 22.4% under the age of 18, 9.1% from 18 to 24, 29.8% from 25 to 44, 21.6% from 45 to 64, and 17.1% 65 or older. The median age was 38 years. For every 100 females, there were 83.7 males. For every 100 females age 18 and over, there were 77.2 males.

The median household income was $37,361 and the median family income  was $44,583. Males had a median income of $27,500 versus $20,833 for females. The per capita income for the town was $18,660. About 8.1% of families and 9.2% of the population were below the poverty line, including 10.8% of those under age 18 and 13.9% of those age 65 or over.

References

Towns in Accomack County, Virginia
Towns in Virginia